Karkasar (also Romanized as Karkasār and Kark Sār; also known as Kargesār and Kargsār) is a village in Dinavar Rural District, Dinavar District, Sahneh County, Kermanshah Province, Iran. At the 2006 census, its population was 237, in 63 families.

References 

Populated places in Sahneh County